Homburg is an electoral constituency (German: Wahlkreis) represented in the Bundestag. It elects one member via first-past-the-post voting. Under the current constituency numbering system, it is designated as constituency 299. It is located in southeastern Saarland, comprising the Saarpfalz-Kreis district and parts of the Neunkirchen and Saarbrücken districts.

Homburg was created for the inaugural 1957 federal election after the accession of Saarland to Germany. Since 2021, it has been represented by Esra Limbacher of the Social Democratic Party of Germany (SPD).

Geography
Homburg is located in southeastern Saarland. As of the 2021 federal election, it comprises the Saarpfalz-Kreis district, the municipalities of Neunkirchen and Spiesen-Elversberg from the Neunkirchen district, and the municipalities of Friedrichsthal, Quierschied, and Sulzbach from the Saarbrücken district.

History
Homburg was created in 1957, then known as Homburg – St. Ingbert. In the 1965 through 1972 elections, it was named St. Ingbert. It acquired its current name in the 1976 election. In the 1957 and 1961 elections, it was constituency 247 in the numbering system. In the 1965 through 1998 elections, it was number 248. Since the 2002 election, it has been number 299.

Originally, the constituency comprised the Homburg district, the St. Ingbert district, and the municipality of Neunkirchen and Amt of Spiesen from Ottweiler district. In the 1976 through 1998 elections, it comprised the Saarpfalz-Kreis district and the municipalities of Neunkirchen and Spiesen-Elversberg  from the Neunkirchen district. It acquired its current borders in the 2002 election.

Members
The constituency was first represented by Kurt Conrad of the Social Democratic Party (SPD) from 1957 to 1961. It was won by Johann Klein of the Christian Democratic Union (CDU) in 1961. Werner Wilhelm regained it for the SPD in 1969 and served until 1980. He was succeeded by fellow SPD member Lothar Fischer from 1980 to 2002. Astrid Klug of the SPD was representative from 2002 to 2009. Alexander Funk of the CDU was elected in 2009 and served until 2017. He was succeeded by party fellow Markus Uhl in 2017. Esra Limbacher won the constituency for the SPD in 2021.

Election results

2021 election

2017 election

2013 election

2009 election

Notes

References

1957 establishments in West Germany
Constituencies established in 1957
Saarpfalz-Kreis
Neunkirchen (German district)
Saarbrücken (district)
Federal electoral districts in Saarland